A wheat lamp is a type of incandescent light designed for use in underground mining, named for inventor Grant Wheat and manufactured by Koehler Lighting Products in Wilkes-Barre, Pennsylvania, United States, a region known for extensive mining activity.

A safety lamp designed for use in potentially hazardous atmospheres such as firedamp and coal dust, the lamp is mounted on the front of the miner's helmet and powered by a wet cell battery worn on the miner's belt. The average wheat lamp uses a three to five watt bulb which will typically operate for five to 16 hours depending on the amp-hour capacity of the battery and the current draw of the bulb being used. 

A grain-of-wheat lamp is an unrelated, very small incandescent lamp used in medical and optical instruments, as well as for illuminating miniature railroad and similar models.

References

Mining equipment
Types of lamp
Safety equipment
Mine safety
Coal mining